Scaphosepalum pulvinare is a species of orchid found in Colombia and Ecuador.

References

pulvinare
Orchids of Colombia
Orchids of Ecuador
Plants described in 1880